Milo may refer to:

Arts and entertainment

Milo (magazine), a strength sports magazine
Milo: Sticky Notes and Brain Freeze, a 2011 children's novel by Alan Silberberg
Milo (video game), a first-person adventure-puzzle computer game

Computing and technology
MILO (boot loader), a firmware replacement used for booting Linux on older Alpha AXP hardware
Milo, a computer algebra system by Paracomp
Eclipse Milo, an open source implementation of the communication protocol OPC Unified Architecture
Project Milo, a tech demo for Microsoft's Kinect

Food and drink
Milo (chocolate bar), an Australian chocolate  bar made with Milo powder
Milo (drink), a brand name of a chocolate malt drink by Nestlé

Plants
Milo, a common name of Thespesia populnea and its wood
Milo, a common name for some varieties of commercial sorghum

People and fictional characters
Milo (name), a list of people and fictional characters with the name Milo

Places

Italy
Milo, Catania, a comune in the Metropolitan City of Catania, Italy
Milo, Trapani, a frazione in the Province of Trapani, Italy

United States
Milo, Indiana, an unincorporated community
Milo, Iowa, a city
Milo, Maine, a New England town
Milo (CDP), Maine, the main village in the town
Milo, Missouri, a village
Milo, New York, a town
Milo, Oklahoma, an unincorporated community
Milo, Oregon, an unincorporated community
Milo, West Virginia, an unincorporated community

Elsewhere
Milo, Alberta, Canada, a village
Milo, Carmarthenshire, Wales, a village
Milo, Ethiopia, a town
Milo, Kenya, a sub-location
Milo, Tanzania, a village and ward
Milo River, a tributary of the Niger River, Guinea

See also
Milos (disambiguation)
Mylo (disambiguation)
Yourcodenameis:milo, a UK post-hardcore band